was the fortieth of the fifty-three stations of the Tōkaidō. It is located in former Owari Province in what is now part of the Midori-ku section of the city of Nagoya, in Aichi Prefecture, Japan.

History
Narumi-juku had a population of 3,643 people at its peak. The post station also had 847 buildings, including one honjin, two wakihonjin and 68 hatago. 

The classic ukiyo-e print by Andō Hiroshige (Hōeidō edition) from 1831 to 1834 depicts travellers passing by open-fronted shops selling tie-died cloth, typically used for making yukata summer kimono, which was a local speciality of the region. The railroad bypassed Narumi-juku in the Meiji period, and a portion of the old town is preserved as a tourist attraction.

Neighboring post towns
Tōkaidō
Chiryū-juku - Narumi-juku - Miya-juku

Further reading
Carey, Patrick. Rediscovering the Old Tokaido:In the Footsteps of Hiroshige. Global Books UK (2000). 
Chiba, Reiko. Hiroshige's Tokaido in Prints and Poetry. Tuttle. (1982) 
Taganau, Jilly. The Tokaido Road: Travelling and Representation in Edo and Meiji Japan. RoutledgeCurzon (2004).

References

Stations of the Tōkaidō
Stations of the Tōkaidō in Aichi Prefecture